The Turin factory occupation of 1920 started off in 1919 when 30,000 workers in Turin, many of them at the Fiat factories, got represented in the workers  councils. The council uprising started in 1920 to spread with factory occupations where the management was overtaken by the workers. Strikes spread over the whole country. The anarchist Errico Malatesta and revolutionary Antonio Gramsci played a key role in the occupation. The incident was part of the social unrest period known in Italy as the Biennio Rosso.

References 
 Ericson/Johansson: Anarkisterna i klasskampen. Tribun 1969. p. 98-104. 
 Riesel, René: Råden och rådsorganisationen. IS 1968. 
 Jacobson, Staffan: Anarkismens återkomst. Lund 2006. p. 40 

1920 in Italy
Antonio Gramsci
Anarchism in Italy
Riots and civil disorder in Italy
1920 riots
Labor disputes in Italy
Fiat